A28 or A-28 may refer to:

Roads 
 A28 road (England), a road in Kent connecting Margate, Canterbury, Ashford, Tenterden and Hastings
 A28 motorway (France), a road connecting Abbeville, Somme and Tours, Indre-et-Loire
 A 28 motorway (Germany), a road connecting Leer and Oldenburg with Bremen
 A28 road (Isle of Man), a road connecting New and the Ballanorris road
 A28 motorway (Italy), a road connecting Conegliano and Portogruaro
 A28 motorway (Netherlands), a road connecting Utrecht and Groningen
 A28 motorway (Portugal), a road connecting Porto to Viana do Castelo

 A 28 road (Sri Lanka), a road connecting Anuradhapura and Padeniya
 A28 (Sydney), a road in Sydney which is commonly known as Cumberland Highway

Other uses 

A-28 Hudson, a Lockheed World War II aircraft
 Aeroprakt A-28 Victor, a 2000s Ukrainian twin engined aircraft design
 Focke-Wulf A 28, a 1927 German airliner
 HLA-A28, a human serotype
 Asahikawa Station, a station in Asahikawa, Hokkaido, Japan, station code A28